Leonora Marescoe, née Lethieullier or Lethiulliers (1637 – 1715) was an English merchant. She managed the trading company Marescoe-Joyes from 1670 until 1675.

Leonora Marescoe was the daughter of a successful merchant and was one of the most noted members of the merchant class in Restoration period London, part of a London colony of Huguenots from the Spanish Netherlands. Her brother was Sir John Lethieullier. She married in 1658 to Charles Marescoe, with the same background and who was one of the most successful merchants in London during the 1660s. After the death of her spouse in 1670, she took over the company. The Marescoe-Joyes belonged to the greatest elite trading houses in London. One of its main trades was that of copper with contacts in the Baltic Sea and Stockholm, where one of her most noted business partners was Debora van der Plas. In 1675, she married the former student of her spouse, Jacob David.

References 
 Richard Grassby Kinship and Capitalism: Marriage, Family, and Business in the English ... 
 Henry Roseveare: Markets and Merchants of the Late Seventeenth Century: The Marescoe-David Letters, 1668–1680, Utgåva 12. Oxford (1991)
 Proceedings, Volym 24. Huguenot Society of London., 1983
 Sebastian Jobs, Gesa Mackenthun: Agents of Transculturation: Border-Crossers, Mediators, Go-Betweens
 Leos Müller: The Merchant Houses of Stockholm, C. 1640-1800: A Comparative Study of Early-modern Entrepreneurial Behaviour. Uppsala University Library, 1 jan. 1998
 Margrit Schulte Beerbuhl: The Forgotten Majority: German Merchants in London, Naturalization, and ...

17th-century English businesspeople
17th-century English businesswomen
English people of Belgian descent
1637 births
1715 deaths